Darryl Banks is an American comic book artist. He worked on one of the first painted comic books, Cyberpunk, and teamed with the writer Mark Ellis to revamp the long-running The Justice Machine series for two publishers, Innovation and Millennium.

Early life
Columbus Eastmoor High School Graduate was born to parents Father Aubrey and Mother Mary Banks (Fowler). A competent artist from central Ohio.
He always loved art but decided in high school that he wanted to pursue a career in comics. Darryl Banks studied at the Columbus College of Art and Design in Ohio.

Comics
After Banks graduated from college, he sent copious samples of his art to DC Comics and Marvel Comics, and went to comics conventions to show his work to publishers. On the advice of friends, he began sending samples to smaller, independent companies. Eventually, Innovation Publishing offered him his first jobs: a two-part Cyberpunk story, followed by a run on Justice Machine.

At Millennium, Banks produced a three-issue mini-series based on The Wild Wild West TV series and a comics adaptation of Doc Savage with The Monarch of Armageddon.

Banks then went to work for DC Comics, illustrating Legion of Super-Heroes. He then became the penciler on Green Lantern vol. 3, starting with the "Emerald Twilight" storyline. Banks drew most of the issues from #50 through #142. Along with co-creating Kyle Rayner, he was responsible for designing costumes for Parallax, Grayven, Fatality, Dr. Polaris, and Dr. Light.

As of 1995 Banks was teaching two courses, one on illustration and one in comic book design at his alma mater, the Columbus College of Art and Design.

References

External links
Gallery of Darryl Banks work at Comic Art Community

African-American comics creators
American comics creators
American comics artists
Year of birth missing (living people)
Living people
Columbus College of Art and Design faculty
21st-century African-American people